Khanoom Mosque is related to the Qajar dynasty and is located in Zanjan, Imam Street.

Gallery

References

Mosques in Iran
Mosque buildings with domes
National works of Iran
Buildings and structures in Zanjan Province